Jaime Fábrega Colón (Fontcoberta, Girona, 1948) is a Spanish gastronomy writer, journalist, historian and professor at some universities. He has written more than fifty gastronomy and cooking books, he has won five times the Gourmand World Cookbook Award and he has made Ferran Adrià known over the world as a Catalan chef. He takes part of some international cultural associations as for example AICA and FIJET.

He has worked as journalist for all the most important journals in Catalonia and Spain, as La Vanguardia, Avui, El Temps, El Món, El Punt, Diari de Girona, etc. and in radio channels as Catalunya Ràdio. Also in cultural or gastronomic publications over the world, as la Gazeta del Arte, Batik, Mesa y más, Descobrir cuina, etc.

He is a very prolific writer who has written some gastronomy encyclopaedic books which have been translated in English and other languages. Some of them are La cuina. Gastronomia tradicional sana, La cuina catalana, etc. He has redacted, for example, El Gran Llibre de la Cuina Catalana for Josep Lladonosa or El Bulli, El sabor del Mediterráneo for Ferran Adrià.

Awards and honors
 Robert de Nola 1981, with Jean-François Revel
 Chaîne des Rôtisseurs 1987
 Jaume Ciurana 1987 of journalism
 Raïm d'Argent 1991 with Juan Maria Arzak
 Premi Nacional d'Assaig of Andorra 1996 and 2007
 Josep Vallverdú 1996
 Rovira i Virgili 1999
 C. Sarthou 2007
 His books have been selected to be exposed in the Olympic International Exposition of Cooking Books of Beijin (China) 2007
 He is the only person in the world who has won five times a Gourmand World Cookbook Awards
 He is director of Pèl & Ploma, a gastronomic collection of "La Magrana" editions

External links
Personal blog in Catalan
Another personal blog, in English and other languages

People from Pla de l'Estany
Catalan-language writers
Writers from Catalonia
Food writers from Catalonia
Spanish essayists
Spanish male writers
Journalists from Catalonia
1948 births
Living people
Male essayists